is a Japanese novelist, especially known for his hardboiled novels. He studied law at Chuo University in the early 1970s. He served as the 10th President of the Mystery Writers of Japan from 1997 to 2001.

Works in English translation
Hardboiled novels
 Ashes (original title: Bō no Kanashimi), trans. Emi Shimokawa (Vertical, 2003)
 Winter Sleep (original title: Fuyu no Nemuri), trans. Mark Schilling (Vertical, 2005)
 The Cage (original title: Ori), trans. Paul Warham (Vertical, 2006)
 City of Refuge (original title: Nogare no Machi), trans. Y.T. Horgan (Vertical, 2012)

Awards and nominations
 1982 - Japan Adventure Fiction Association Prize: Nemuri Naki Yoru (Sleepless Night)
 1983 - Yoshikawa Eiji Prize for New Writers: Nemuri Naki Yoru (Sleepless Night)
 1983 - Japan Adventure Fiction Association Prize: The Cage
 1984 - Nominee for Mystery Writers of Japan Award for Best Novel: The Cage
 1985 - Mystery Writers of Japan Award for Best Novel: Kawaki no Machi (City of Thirst)
 1991 - Shibata Renzaburo Prize: Hagun no Hoshi (Alkaid)
 2004 - Yoshikawa Eiji Prize for Literature: Yōkashō (Generals of the Yang Family)
 2006 - Shiba Ryotaro Prize: Suikoden (Water Margin)
 2009 - Japan Mystery Literature Award for Lifetime Achievement

Main works

Standalone hardboiled novels
 , 1981
 , 1982 (City of Refuge, Vertical, 2012)
 , 1983
 , 1983
 , 1983
 , 1983 (The Cage, Vertical, 2006)
 , 1984
 , 1984
 , 1984
 , 1984
 , 1984
 , 1984
 , 1984
 , 1985
 , 1985
 , 1985
 , 1985
 , 1985
 , 1985
 , 1986
 , 1986
 , 1986
 , 1986
 , 1986
 , 1987
 , 1987
 , 1987
 , 1987
 , 1988
 , 1989
 , 1989
 , 1990
 , 1990 (Ashes, Vertical, 2003)
 , 1991
 , 1992
 , 1993
 , 1994
 , 1994
 , 1994
 , 1994
 , 1995
 , 1995
 , 1996 (Winter Sleep, Vertical, 2005)
 , 1999
 , 1999
 , 2001
 , 2003

Short story collections
 , 1988
 , 1993
 , 2002

See also

Japanese detective fiction

References

External links
 Profile at J'Lit Books from Japan 
 Synopsis of The Cage at JLPP (Japanese Literature Publishing Project) 

1947 births
Living people
20th-century Japanese novelists
21st-century Japanese novelists
Japanese male short story writers
Japanese crime fiction writers
Mystery Writers of Japan Award winners
Recipients of the Medal with Purple Ribbon
Japanese historical novelists
People from Saga Prefecture
Chuo University alumni
20th-century Japanese short story writers
21st-century Japanese short story writers
20th-century Japanese male writers
21st-century male writers